The Classic 26 is an American sailboat that was designed by W. Shad Turner as a cruiser and first built in 1991.

Production
The design was built by Classic Yachts in Chanute, Kansas,  United States, starting in 1991. A total of 41 boats were completed, but it is now out of production.

The Classic 26 is a development of the Laguna 26 and the similar Windrose 26 and was built from the same hull molds acquired by Classic after Laguna Yachts went out of business.

Design
The Classic 26 is a recreational keelboat, built predominantly of fiberglass, with wood trim. It has a masthead sloop rig, a raked stem, a plumb transom, a transom-hung rudder controlled by a tiller and a fixed fin keel. It displaces  and carries  of ballast.

See also
List of sailing boat types

References

Keelboats
1990s sailboat type designs
Sailing yachts
Trailer sailers
Sailboat type designs by W. Shad Turner
Sailboat types built by Classic Yachts